Linda is a rural locality (a village) in Abdrashitovsky Selsoviet, Alsheyevsky District, Bashkortostan, Russia. The population was 116 as of 2010. There are 2 streets.

Geography 
Linda is located 14 km east of Rayevsky (the district's administrative centre) by road. Shishma is the nearest rural locality.

References 

Rural localities in Alsheyevsky District